Oyim is an urban-type settlement in Andijan Region, Uzbekistan. It is located in Jalaquduq District. Its population is 10,000 (2016).

References

Populated places in Andijan Region
Urban-type settlements in Uzbekistan